George Nedungatt (21 December 1932 – 26 October 2022) was an Indian Jesuit priest of Syro-Malabar Catholic Church, and expert in Oriental Canon Law.

Nedungatt was born at Peringuzha near Muvattupuzha in India, as the second son of Mr Kunjupappa and Mrs Mariam. He had three brothers. The Nedungatt family had many priestly and religious vocations. The late Mgr Mathew Nedungatt, Syncellus of Thiruvalla and later of Battery eparchies, was his paternal uncle; the late Sr Catherine SIC was his aunt; Fr Johny Nedungatt SDB is his nephew. Among his cousins Nedungatt are Fr Vincent and the late Fr Mathew CMI, and the two late Jesuits (Br Varghese and Fr Joseph). Fr Sanal Jose Nedungatt of the eparchy of Kothamangalam is the son of a nephew of Fr George. The Marian Sodality in his parish (Kalloorkad, the present-day Kothamangalam eparchy) was organised by him which he equipped with a library.

Jesuit formation 
After his secondary education, he joined the Jesuit novitiate on 11 June 1950 at Christ Hall, where he had also his juniorate formation (1952-1954). He did his philosophy training (with a BA degree) at Sacred Heart College, Shembaganur (1954-1959). Then he did regency at St Joseph’s College, Trichy and Leo XIII High School, Alleppey (1960-1961). For theological studies, he went to St Mary’s College, Kurseong (1961-1965), where he was ordained a priest on 19 March 1964. He did his tertianship at La Providence, Kodaikanal (1966-1967). In the hands of Fr Pedro Arrupe, he made his final religious profession at the church of Gesù, Rome on 2 February 1968.

After his ordination, he was sent to the Pontifical Oriental Institute in Rome for higher studies in 1967, where he did licentiate (1969) and doctorate (1973) in canon law. He defended his doctoral thesis on 17 January 1973, entitled Covenant Law and Pastoral Ministry according to Aphrahat: Element for a Theologia Juris from Syrian Orient till 350 A.D, which he wrote under the guidance of Ivan Žužek SJ and Ignacio Ortiz de Urbina SJ.

Professor and expert 
For about 35 years (1973-2007), he taught canon law at the Oriental Institute, and served as the dean of its Faculty of Eastern Canon Law (1981-1987). There he taught Theology of Law, Philosophy of Law, Clerics and Laity, Magisterium, Juridical Methodology, and Canonical Latin. After his retirement from teaching, in order to complete some academic works, he remained in the Jesuit community of the Oriental Institute until 29 February 2012, on which day he returned to his province (Kerala). He was a visiting professor at the Institute of Oriental Canon Law (IOCL) of Dharmaram Vidya Kshetram Bangalore (India) from 1999 to 2012, and a resident teacher from 2012 to 2015. There he taught Theology of Law, Philosophy of Law and at times Latin. From the IOCL, he went to the Jesuit community of Kalady (India), where he continued his research and publication. In March 2022, he was transferred to Christ Hall, where he lived until his passing away.
A scholar of international reputation, Fr Nedungatt wrote several well-known books and articles. In his writings and lectures, Fr George took an interdisciplinary approach. His competence in various areas is manifest in his works like The Laity and Church Temporalities: Appraisal of a Tradition. He was a canon lawyer who wrote also on spirituality, history, sociology, bible, philosophy, theology, patrology and hermeneutics.

Nedungatt's contribution as a consultor of the Pontifical Commission for the Revision of the Eastern Code of Canon Law (1973-1990) deserves praise. As the Relator of the committee on Clerics and Ecclesiastical Magisterium, he drafted its canons, many of which passed with little or no change, into the code. He has left his mark on the very heading of the eastern code.
The name of Fr Nedungatt appeared in the Annuario Pontificio for several years: as consultor of the Congregation for the Eastern Churches, of the Congregation for the Causes of Saints, and of the Pontifical Council for Legislative Texts. He did significant work as the president of the Apostolic Tribunal in the cause of St Alphonsa; and as the postulator in the cause of St Mariam Thresia. He worked for some time as the postulator of the causes of the Servant of God Joseph Vithayathil and of St Devasahayam Pillai. As the postulator of the cause of St Euphrasia, he presented the diocesan enquiry on a miracle to the Congregation for the Causes of Saints.
A polyglot, he knew English, Italian, French, German, Spanish, and Portuguese, besides his own mother tongue Malayalam. For purposes of research, he could handle ancient languages like Sanskrit, Syriac, Hebrew and Greek. Many Jesuits know him as their Latin professor. This language facility was an invaluable tool which opened before him a wide world of knowledge and made his works erudite. In an international symposium I attended, he was the only speaker who answered questions in the same language in which they were put from the floor.
Justice as a great value is a recurring theme in his writings and was so in his lessons. He presents the Church’s law as a safeguard for justice, thus underscoring its ministerial aspect. He was flexible in interpreting and applying canon law, provided justice and order were guaranteed. On the other hand, he was demanding when it was a question of quality and our commitment to the Church’s mission.

Professor Nedungatt was also a perennial student. His intellectual curiosity was ever active and he injected it into his listeners and readers. He was attentive to the changes, developments and undercurrents in politics and in scientific research. Since his philosophy days he was a regular listener of the BBC. Critically attentive to the media, he felt in them the pulse of humanity and its aspirations. On the other hand, “professor of professors” would be a more suitable designation for Fr Nedungatt. His works are rather resources for those doing research than for students who only seek to get information. His familiarity with primary sources made his works authoritative.
Criticism, if done properly, nurtures growth. Fr Nedungatt’s criticism is always constructive. He even criticises the codes of canon law but always in a scientific, scholarly and responsible manner. He even criticised Pope Benedict XVI for not explicitly recognising the apostle Thomas’ arrival in South India. His articles in this regard made the pope correct his discourse in its published version.

If our criterion to evaluate a professor is the number of students choosing him to guide their doctoral dissertation, we may not rate Fr Nedungatt very high. Very few students chose him as the director of their doctoral dissertation. He was very demanding and wanted his students to work hard as he did. Thirteen students wrote doctoral dissertation under his guidance.
He respected the opinions of others, even when they were different from his own, but he was able to remain friends with them. He was guided more by reason than by passion. When one of his books, intended to be published at the Oriental Institute, but failed in its peer review, he did not lose calm. He was not frustrated with the failing, but took it peacefully. That was an occasion to know the depth of the faith of a man of renowned scholarship.
He remained a faithful Companion of Jesus. He would not bypass anyone found lying wounded on the way. He had a gentle way of dealing with the weak, with the lay collaborators of his institute and community, and with the poor in the street. He showed concern for them and their problems. Out of the honorarium he got from priestly ministry in Germany and Italy, with the permission of his superiors, he had about twenty houses built for the poor in his home parish. A pioneer, a lover of Jesus and of the Church, and of the mission he was given, Fr George would not seek his own comfort and pleasure.

Personal life and death
Nedungatt died at Christ Hall, Kozhikode, Kerala, India on 26 October 2022, at the age of 89.

Major works 
Nedungatt has published many books and hundreds of articles in various theological journals.
 The Spirit of the Eastern Code, Bangalore, 1992.
 The Council in Trullo Revisited, edited together with Michael Featherstone (Kanonika 6), Rome, 1995.
 Laity and Church Temporalities: Appraisal of a Tradition, Bangalore, 2000.
 The Synod of Diamper Revisited, ed., (Kanonika 9), Rome, 2001.
 A Guide to the Eastern Code: Commentary on the Code of Canons of the Eastern Churches, ed., (Kanonika 10), Rome, 2002.
 Quest for the Historical Thomas Apostle of India: A Re-reading of the Evidence, Bangalore, 2008.
 Renewal of Life and Law: An Indian Contribution (Dharmaram Canonical Studies 10), Bangalore, 2015.
 Covenant Life, Law and Ministry according to Aphrahat (Kanonika 26), Rome, 2018.
 Theology of Law (Kanonika 28), Rome, 2019.

Bibliography 
 A Festschrift was published in his honour in 2003: The Syro-Malabar Church since the Eastern Code, (Ed.: Francis Eluvathingal), 2003.

References

External links 
 Classified Bibliography of Prof. George Nedungatt upto (sic) April 2009

1932 births
2022 deaths
Canonical theologians
20th-century Indian Roman Catholic theologians
Canon law jurists
21st-century Indian Jesuits
Syro-Malabar priests
20th-century Indian Jesuits
People from Ernakulam district